Sir Samuel Hill Hill-Wood, 1st Baronet (21 March 1872 – 4 January 1949), born Samuel Hill Wood, was a British businessman, Conservative politician, cricketer and football club chairman.

Early life
Wood was born in Glossop, Derbyshire, the son of Samuel Wood, a cotton manufacturer and his wife Annie. His father made his fortune in the cotton industry in Derbyshire during the late 19th century. Samuel Hill Wood was educated at Eton College and was a keen sportsman. He continued to run the cotton business.

Cricket career
Wood made his cricket debut for Derbyshire in the 1894 season, and became their captain in the 1899 season for three seasons. Wood was the only batsman to score 10 runs off one ball in a first-class game. In May 1900, when playing for Derbyshire against Marylebone Cricket Club (MCC), he struck a ball from Cuthbert Burnup and as a result of the netting and an overthrow clocked up ten – a feat which was originally included in the Guinness Book of Records. Wood was a right hand batsman and played 54 innings in 24 first-class matches, with an average of 17.62 and a top score of 81 not out. He took no wickets in the 93 balls he bowled. Under his captaincy Derbyshire were fifteenth in the County Championship in 1899, thirteenth in 1900 and back to fifteenth in 1901.

Football at Glossop
Wood was chairman and owner of Glossop North End funding it up until World War I. His expenditure was estimated to be more than £30,000 at that time. His efforts and enthusiasm led to the club being included in the enlarged Football League Second Division in 1898. He scoured the country for professional footballers and after only one season Glossop qualified as Second Division runners up and were promoted to the First Division. They were relegated after a season and by 1914 Hill Wood severed his connection and Glossop later resigned from the Football League.

Political career

In 1910, Hill Wood was elected MP for High Peak, holding the seat until 1929. He changed his name to Hill-Wood by royal licence in 1912.

In the First World War, he served in the Cheshire Regiment reaching the rank of Major.

Announced in the 1921 New Year Honours, he was created a baronet on 25 January 1921.

Arsenal chairmanship

In 1929, after leaving parliament, he succeeded the disgraced Henry Norris as chairman of Arsenal, and presided over the club during its first period of success in the 1930s. He stepped down in 1936 but returned to the role after the Second World War, holding the post until his death in Westminster in 1949. In another field of sport, he owned two greyhounds who won the Waterloo Cup.

Family
Hill Wood married The Hon. Rachel Bateman-Hanbury, youngest daughter of Lord Bateman-Hanbury, in 1899 and had four sons: Basil, Wilfred, Denis and Charles. His son Denis and his grandson Peter Hill-Wood have also served as Chairmen of Arsenal, while his sons, Basil, Denis, Wilfred and Charles have all played county cricket for the Derbyshire County Cricket Club at various points in their history. Basil's brother-in-law David Brand also played some first class cricket.

References

External links
 

1872 births
1949 deaths
Baronets in the Baronetage of the United Kingdom
English cricketers
British Army personnel of World War I
Cheshire Regiment officers
Derbyshire cricket captains
Conservative Party (UK) MPs for English constituencies
Arsenal F.C. directors and chairmen
People educated at Eton College
People from Glossop
Cricketers from Derbyshire
Members of the Parliament of the United Kingdom for constituencies in Derbyshire
UK MPs 1910–1918
UK MPs 1918–1922
UK MPs 1922–1923
UK MPs 1923–1924
UK MPs 1924–1929
English football chairmen and investors
High Peak, Derbyshire
Suffolk cricketers
British sportsperson-politicians
Deputy Lieutenants of Derbyshire